Below is the list of subcamps of the Dachau complex of Nazi concentration camps.

See also

List of Nazi-German concentration camps
List of subcamps of Mauthausen, other extensive net of camps operating in Austria and southern Germany
Website with camp names

References

 
Dachau
Subcamps of Nazi concentration camps